Roof shapes include flat (or shed), gabled, hipped, arched, domed, and a wide variety of other configurations detailed below.

Roof angles are an integral component of roof shape, and vary from almost flat to steeply pitched.

Roof shapes differ greatly from region to region, depending on the climate, materials available, customs, and many other considerations.

Roof terminology is not rigidly defined. Usages vary from region to region, nation to nation, and from one builder or architect to another.

Roof shapes

 Flat: These are found in traditional buildings in regions with a low precipitation. Modern materials which are highly impermeable to water make possible the low-pitch roofs found on large commercial buildings. Although referred to as flat they are generally gently pitched.
 Roof terrace (including roof garden)
 Single-pitched roof
 Shed roof (lean-to, pent roof, skirt roof, outshot, skillion, mono-roof): A roof with one slope, historically attached to a taller wall.
 Saw-tooth: Multiple single-pitched roofs arrayed in a row, sometimes seen on factories.
 Multi-pitched roof:
 Gable (ridged, dual-pitched, peaked, saddle, pack-saddle, saddleback, span roof): A simple roof design shaped like an inverted V.
 Cross gabled: The result of joining two or more gabled roof sections together, forming a T or L shape for the simplest forms, or any number of more complex shapes.
See also roof pitch, crow-stepped, corbie stepped, stepped gable: A gable roof with its end parapet walls below extended slightly upwards and shaped to resemble steps.
 A-frame
 Half-hipped (clipped gable, jerkinhead): A combination of a gable and a hip roof (pitched roof without changes to the walls) with the hipped part at the top and the gable section lower down.
 Dutch gable, gablet: A hybrid of hipped and gable with the gable (wall) at the top and hipped lower down; i.e. the opposite arrangement to the half-hipped roof. Overhanging eaves forming shelter around the building are a consequence where the gable wall is in line with the other walls of the buildings; i.e., unless the upper gable is recessed.
 Saltbox, catslide: A gable roof with one side longer than the other, and thus closer to the ground unless the pitch on one side is altered.
 Bonnet roof: A reversed gambrel or Mansard roof with the lower portion at a lower pitch than the upper portion.
 Monitor roof: A roof with a monitor; 'a raised structure running part or all of the way along the ridge of a double-pitched roof, with its own roof running parallel with the main roof.'
 Butterfly roof (V-roof, London roof): A V-shaped roof resembling an open book. A kink separates the roof into two parts running towards each other at an obtuse angle.
 Karahafu: A type of gable found in some traditional Japanese buildings.
 Hidden roof: A type of Japanese roof construction.
Hip, hipped: A hipped roof is sloped in two pairs of directions (e.g. N–S and E–W) compared to the one pair of direction (e.g. N–S or E–W) for a gable roof.
 Cross hipped: The result of joining two or more hip roof sections together, forming a T or L shape for the simplest forms, or any number of more complex shapes.
 Satari: A Swedish variant on the monitor roof; a double hip roof with a short vertical wall usually with small windows, popular from the 17th century on formal buildings. (Säteritak in Swedish.)
 Mansard (French roof): A roof with the pitch divided into a shallow slope above a steeper slope. The steep slope may be curved. An element of the Second Empire architectural style (Mansard style) in the U.S.
 Gambrel, curb, kerb: A roof similar to a mansard but sloped in one direction rather than both.
 Bell-cast (sprocketed, flared): A roof with the shallow slope below the steeper slope at the eaves. Compare with bell roof.
 East Asian hip-and-gable roof
 Mokoshi: A Japanese decorative pent roof
 Pavilion roof : A low-pitched roof hipped equally on all sides and centered over a square or regular polygonal floor plan. The sloping sides rise to a peak. For steep tower roof variants use Pyramid roof.
 Pyramid roof: A steep hip roof on a square building.
 Pyatthat: A multi-tiered and spired roof commonly found in Burmese royal and Buddhist architecture.
 Tented: A type of polygonal hipped roof with steeply pitched slopes rising to a peak
 Helm roof, Rhenish helm: A pyramidal roof with gable ends; often found on church towers.
 Spiral, a steeply pitched spire which twists as it goes up.
 Barrel, barrel-arched (cradle, wagon): A round roof like a barrel (tunnel) vault.
 Catenary: An arched roof in the form of a catenary curve.
 Arched roof, bow roof, Gothic, Gothic arch, and ship's bottom roof. Historically also called a compass roof.
 Circular
 Bell roof (bell-shaped, ogee, Philibert de l'Orme roof): A bell-shaped roof. Compare with bell-cast eaves.
 Domed
 Onion dome or rather an imperial roof
 Bochka roof
 Conical roof or cone roof
Hyperbolic
 Saddle

Illustrations

Selection criteria 
 Climate 
 Location
 Material availability
 Material cost
 Installation cost
 Neighbouring buildings
 Building geometry
 Aesthetics
 Engineering concerns
 Functionality
 Local customs
 restrictive covenants
 Building codes

Gallery

See also 
 Building construction
 Building envelope
 Building insulation
 Green roof: A roof with plantings to be more environmentally friendly, may be any form.
 List of commercially available roofing material
 Roof
 Stupa

References

External links 
 

 
Structural engineering
Structural system
roof shapes